Southeast Roseau is an unorganized territory in Roseau County, Minnesota, United States. The population was 229 at the 2000 census.

Geography
According to the United States Census Bureau, the unorganized territory has a total area of 179.2 square miles (464.3 km2); 178.8 square miles (463.2 km2) is land and 0.4 square mile (1.1 km2) (0.23%) is water.

Demographics
As of the census of 2000, there were 229 people, 87 households, and 62 families residing in the unorganized territory.  The population density was 1.3 people per square mile (0.5/km2).  There were 107 housing units at an average density of 0.6/sq mi (0.2/km2).  The racial makeup of the unorganized territory was 98.69% White, 0.87% Native American, 0.44% from other races.

There were 87 households, out of which 39.1% had children under the age of 18 living with them, 64.4% were married couples living together, 3.4% had a female householder with no husband present, and 28.7% were non-families. 21.8% of all households were made up of individuals, and 6.9% had someone living alone who was 65 years of age or older.  The average household size was 2.63 and the average family size was 3.11.

In the unorganized territory the population was spread out, with 28.4% under the age of 18, 4.4% from 18 to 24, 32.8% from 25 to 44, 27.1% from 45 to 64, and 7.4% who were 65 years of age or older.  The median age was 38 years. For every 100 females, there were 114.0 males.  For every 100 females age 18 and over, there were 118.7 males.

The median income for a household in the unorganized territory was $49,211, and the median income for a family was $48,487. Males had a median income of $38,333 versus $30,298 for females. The per capita income for the unorganized territory was $18,263.  About 5.1% of families and 2.2% of the population were below the poverty line, including none of those under the age of 18 or 65 or over.

References

Populated places in Roseau County, Minnesota
Unorganized territories in Minnesota